Matthew Highmore (born February 27, 1996) is a Canadian professional ice hockey player, currently playing with the Springfield Thunderbirds in the American Hockey League (AHL) while under contract to the St. Louis Blues of the National Hockey League (NHL).

Playing career

Highmore was drafted 8th overall by the Saint John Sea Dogs in the 2012 QMJHL Entry Draft. He was awarded alternate captain during the 2014–15 QMJHL season.
 
Despite his success as an alternate captain in the QMJHL, Highmore was passed over at the NHL Entry Draft twice, the second time being in his last year of eligibility. However, in his last year with the Saint John Sea Dogs, where he led Saint John in assists and points, the Chicago Blackhawks chose to sign him to a three-year NHL contract in March 2017 as an undrafted player. In his last year with the Sea Dogs, he was the only player who earned a professional hockey contract without being drafted. At the end of the 2016–17 season, Highmore was named Sea Dogs MVP and was awarded the Pepsi Top Scorer Award for the second year in a row, after netting 34 goals and 89 total points.

Highmore started the 2017–18 season with the Blackhawks AHL affiliate, the Rockford IceHogs. He recorded his first professional hat trick against the Iowa Wild on December 27, 2017. After leading his team in points, Highmore was selected to participate in the 2018 AHL All-Star Classic along with teammate Carl Dahlström. On February 24, 2018, Highmore became the first Rockford rookie to score more than 20 goals in their rookie season since Rockford joined the Blackhawks organization in 2007. Highmore was called up to the NHL for the first time on February 26, 2018. He made his NHL debut on March 1, 2018, in a 7–2 loss to the San Jose Sharks. He had two shots on net in under 13 minutes of ice time. Highmore recorded his first NHL goal in a 4–7 loss to the Boston Bruins on March 10, 2018. He was reassigned to the AHL on March 27, 2018, after playing in 13 games and recording 2 points. On April 13, 2018, Highmore was named the IceHogs Rookie of the Year after he was tied for the team lead with 42 points and ranked fourth among rookies in the league in goals. During the last regular season game before the 2018 Calder Cup playoffs, Highmore set a new IceHogs rookie goal record with his 24th goal of the season.

While attending the Blackhawks training camp prior to the 2018–19 season, Highmore was reassigned to the IceHogs on September 26, 2018, to begin the season in the AHL. He was later named an alternate captain for the IceHogs prior to the 2018-19 season. On November 13, Highmore underwent surgery to repair his right shoulder and he was expected to need four to six months to recover. After rehabilitating, Highmore spent the summer training in Halifax with other NHL and AHL players.

He attended the Blackhawks training camp prior to the 2019–20 season but was reassigned to the IceHogs. He was subsequently named an alternate captain alongside Jacob Nilsson and Tyler Sikura. After recording four goals and six assists in 17 games, Highmore was recalled to the NHL on November 26. Highmore recorded 3 goals and 1 assist during the Blackhawks' play-in and playoff run during the 2019–20 NHL playoff bubble.

On April 12, 2021, Highmore was traded from the Blackhawks to the Vancouver Canucks in exchange for Adam Gaudette.

The St. Louis Blues signed Highmore to a one-year, two way contract on July 14, 2022.

Personal life
Highmore attended Maritime Varsity Academy, a school that focused on athletics, from 2008 to 2010.

Career statistics

Regular season and playoffs

International

References

External links
 

1996 births
Canadian ice hockey forwards
Chicago Blackhawks players
Ice hockey people from Nova Scotia
Living people
Rockford IceHogs (AHL) players
Sportspeople from Halifax, Nova Scotia
Saint John Sea Dogs players
St. Louis Blues players
Springfield Thunderbirds players
Undrafted National Hockey League players
Vancouver Canucks players